Scot Chisholm (born June 15, 1981) is an American social entrepreneur who founded the software company Classy - a San Diego based Benefit corporation that creates fundraising tools for nonprofit organizations. Chisholm was named one of Glassdoor's 'Highest Rated CEOs' in 2017 for small and medium sized businesses, and served as CEO until 2021. In 2022, Classy was acquired by GoFundMe.   

Chisholm later founded Haskill Creek Farms, a modern wellness company, and Save Farmland, a nonprofit that protects and promotes small farms. He is also co-owner of Albion Soccer Club, a large youth soccer franchises in the United States.

Early life 
Chisholm was born in Weymouth, Massachusetts to Debra and Paul Chisholm. After attending Hingham High School, he graduated from the University of Massachusetts, Amherst in 2004 with a degree in Industrial Engineering and Operations Research with a Mechanical Engineering concentration. During his time at college, Chisholm met Pat Walsh, who would later become one of the co-founders of Classy.

Career

Early career 
After attending college, Chisholm moved to San Diego, CA and joined management consulting firm Booz Allen Hamilton. He served as a senior consultant on the Economic and Business Analysis Team from 2004 through 2007, and helped create the Lean Six Sigma practice at the firm.

Classy 
In 2006, Chisholm founded Classy with Pat Walsh, which originally started as a charity pub crawl to raise money for cancer research. The event was called the Stay Classy Pacific Beach Pub Crawl, inspired by the movie Anchorman with Will Ferrell. Over the next several years, Chisholm and friends hosted many fundraising events to raise money for local nonprofit organizations in the San Diego area.  

as a charity fundraising events and evolved into a fundraising platform. 

Chisholm and his team launched an enhanced version of the Classy platform in January 2011 and since then, Classy has helped millions of people across 300,000 individual campaigns fund over 3,000 organizations. Collectively, organizations have raised over $500 million on Classy’s platform. Classy itself has raised $53 million from investors that include Bullpen Capital, JMI Equity, Mithril, and Salesforce Ventures.

Chisholm also served as Board Director from 2011 to 2015 at Team Rubicon, which connects skilled military veterans with medical professionals to form teams that respond better to disaster situations.

In addition, he also is involved in two soccer-oriented organizations. Since 2015, he has served as Board Director and Founding Investor of San Francisco City Football Club, one of the first social enterprise-based, semi-professional soccer clubs in the United States. He also has been a National Advisory Board Member since early 2017 at Street Soccer USA, an organization that uses sports to improve health, education, and employment outcomes for disadvantaged Americans.

Recognition 
In 2011, Chisholm was named by Businessweek as one of the 'Top 5 Most Promising Social Entrepreneurs in America'.

In 2017, he was named 'Top Rated CEO' in the United States for small and medium sized businesses by Glassdoor.

In 2018, he was named an Ernst & Young 'Entrepreneur of the Year' finalist. 

Chisholm was also recognized as one of the '500 Most Influential Business Leaders in San Diego' by San Diego Business Journal in 2017, 2018, 2019, 2020, 2021 and 2022.

References 

Living people
University of Massachusetts Amherst College of Engineering alumni
Social entrepreneurs
1981 births